This is a list of Chinese medalists at the Summer and Winter Olympics. For more information about Chinese participation at the Olympic Games, see China at the Olympics.

Summer Olympics

Winter Olympics

References
 Official Olympic medal count

External links
Chinese Olympic committee

Olympic medalists for China
Lists of Olympic medalists